Slob Historic District, near Christiansted, Virgin Islands, is a historic district which was listed on the National Register of Historic Places in 1987.

It was a large sugar plantation, started in the mid-1700s and owned by the Bodkin family until 1784.  The estate included a factory building, a water mill tower, a great house built around 1750, and a slave village.  Slaves were emancipated in 1848, and the estate declined and was largely used for grazing sheep and cattle.  There were riots and the plantation was burned in 1878.

It has also been known as Estate Slob, as Body Slob, and as Slob.

The Slob Historic District includes the Great House and five slave cottages from the late 1700s and two from the early 1800s in the slave village.  The slave village was the birthplace of Cyril King, the island of St. Croix's first native-born governor. The district also includes the stables and an 1840s factory building.

Notes

References

External links
Photos in Flickr photostream of user "National Register of Historic Places Pro" (: 
Flickr photo of tower,
Flickr photo of Great House in use by Department of Health, 
scroll to see other Slob estate photos.

Sugar plantations
National Register of Historic Places in the United States Virgin Islands
Saint Croix, U.S. Virgin Islands